Mike Ramsay  may refer to:
Mike Ramsay, candidate of the Liberal Party in the 2003 Ontario, Canada provincial election
Mike Ramsay, co-creator of TiVo and co-founder of the company, TiVo Inc.

See also
Mike Ramsey (disambiguation)